Yang Yang (born 24 August 1976 in Jiamusi, Heilongjiang, China) is a retired Chinese short track speed skater. She is a two-time Olympic Champion from 2002 Winter Olympics and a six-time Overall World Champion for 1997–2002. Known as Yang Yang (A), she was formerly a member of the Chinese national short track team. Yang is one of the most accomplished short track speed skaters of all time having won 34 world titles, including six Overall World Championships. She is the first person to have won six Overall World Titles and won six consecutively. Her victory in the women's 500 m short track at the 2002 Winter Olympics made her China's first-ever Winter Olympics gold medalist. She added a second gold in the women's 1000 m short track at the same Games and has also won two silver and a bronze medal. After 2003 World Championships, Yang took time off competing, but came back in 2004–2005 season in lead-up to 2006 Winter Olympics where she won the bronze medal in 1000m race. She retired soon afterwards.

Naming
Yang, born 1976, is sometimes known as Yang Yang (A), to differentiate her from the speed skater named Yang Yang born in 1977 (known as "Yang Yang (S)").

By coincidence, Yang Yang had a contemporary on the Chinese skating team, one year and one month her junior, also named Yang Yang in pinyin and English (although with a different given name character in Chinese). The "(A)" identifier was used as a way to distinguish her from the younger Yang Yang. Originally, the older Yang Yang was known as Yang Yang (L) for "large" (大 or 'big' in Chinese is used to distinguish between younger and older persons of roughly the same age), as she is older than Yang Yang (S) for "small"; however, she objected to the "L" identifier, changing it to "A" for "August", her birth month. Although the younger Yang Yang (S) is now retired from competition and there is no longer a need to distinguish between the two in results, Yang Yang (A) still used the identifier in competition, considering it a part of her identity.

Retirement
Yang Yang (A) was chosen to be one of 12,000 torchbearers to carry the Olympic torch for the Vancouver 2010 Olympics, and on November 22, 2009, she ran a portion of the Prince Edward Island legs.

Yang was elected as an IOC member in 2010 becoming mainland China's fourth IOC member. She is also a committee member of the World Anti Doping Agency, and founding member of the Chinese Athlete Education Foundation.

In 2013, Yang co-founded the Feiyang Skating Centre in Shanghai, a new double-rink facility with an Olympic-sized rink upstairs and a recreational-sized rink downstairs, built to promote ice sports in China.

In 2021, Yang became a high profile supporter of UNHCR, the UN refugee agency. She amplifies Chinese social media content highlighting the power of sport to transform the lives of people fleeing conflict and persecution.

Career

Gallery

References

External links
 Yang Yang (A) (Short-track Speed Skating) from china.org.cn
 

1976 births
Living people
Chinese female short track speed skaters
Olympic bronze medalists for China
Olympic gold medalists for China
Olympic short track speed skaters of China
Olympic silver medalists for China
Olympic medalists in short track speed skating
Short track speed skaters at the 1998 Winter Olympics
Short track speed skaters at the 2002 Winter Olympics
Short track speed skaters at the 2006 Winter Olympics
Medalists at the 1998 Winter Olympics
Medalists at the 2002 Winter Olympics
Medalists at the 2006 Winter Olympics
Asian Games medalists in short track speed skating
Short track speed skaters at the 1996 Asian Winter Games
Short track speed skaters at the 1999 Asian Winter Games
Short track speed skaters at the 2003 Asian Winter Games
International Olympic Committee members
World Anti-Doping Agency members
People from Jiamusi
Sportspeople from Heilongjiang
Medalists at the 1996 Asian Winter Games
Medalists at the 1999 Asian Winter Games
Medalists at the 2003 Asian Winter Games
Asian Games gold medalists for China
Asian Games silver medalists for China
Universiade bronze medalists for China
Universiade medalists in short track speed skating
Competitors at the 1997 Winter Universiade